Zusazawa Dam is a gravity dam located in Yamanashi Prefecture in Japan. The dam is used for power production. The catchment area of the dam is 178 km2. The dam impounds about 1  ha of land when full and can store 45 thousand cubic meters of water. The construction of the dam was started on 1925 and completed in 1926.

References

Dams in Yamanashi Prefecture
1926 establishments in Japan